The 2016 Baylor Bears baseball team represents Baylor University during the 2016 NCAA Division I baseball season. The Bears play their home games at Baylor Ballpark as a member of the Big 12 Conference. They are led by head coach Steve Rodriguez, in his 1st season at Baylor.

Previous season
In 2015, the Bears finished the season 8th in the Big 12 with a record of 23–32 (9–15 Big 12). Baylor qualified for the 2015 Big 12 Conference baseball tournament and was eliminated in the tournament semifinal. They failed to qualify for the 2015 NCAA Division I baseball tournament. At the conclusion of the 2015 season, Baylor fired 21-year head coach Steve Smith, the winningest coach in Baylor athletic history. On June 12, 2015, Baylor announced Pepperdine Waves head coach Steve Rodriguez as the Bears' new head coach for 2016; Rodriguez, a Pepperdine alum, played on the Waves' 1992 national championship team, then led the Waves to the NCAA tournament in 8 of his 12 years as head coach.

Personnel

Roster

Coaching staff

Schedule and results

! style="background:#003015;color:white;"| Regular Season
|- valign="top" 

|- bgcolor="#ffbbbb"
| February 19 || 6:35 pm || FSSW+ || * ||  || Baylor Ballpark • Waco, TX || L2–7 || Bremer(0–1) || Castano(0–1) || – || 2,836 || 0–1 || –
|- bgcolor="#bbffbb"
| February 20 || 3:05 pm || || Washington* ||  || Baylor Ballpark • Waco, TX || W9–5 || Heineman(1–0) || Nesbitt(0–1) || – || 2,464 || 1–1 || –
|- bgcolor="#ffbbbb"
| February 21 || 1:05 pm || FSSW+ || Washington* ||  || Baylor Ballpark • Waco, TX || L1–7 || Nesbitt(1–1) || Lewis(0–1) || Rallings(1) || 2,155 || 1–2 || –
|- bgcolor="#ffbbbb"
| February 24 || 6:35 pm ||  || * ||  || Baylor Ballpark • Waco, TX || L2–9 || Simmons(1–1) || McInvale(0–1) || – || 1,919 || 1–3 || –
|- bgcolor="#bbffbb"
| February 26 || 6:35 pm ||  || * ||  || Baylor Ballpark • Waco, TX || W16–2 || Castano(1–1) || Honahan(1–1) || – || 2,240 || 2–3 || –
|- bgcolor="#bbffbb"
| February 27 || 3:05 pm ||  || Stony Brook* ||  || Baylor Ballpark • Waco, TX || W20–4 || Tolson(1–0) || Stone(0–1) || – || 2,383 || 3–3 || –
|- bgcolor="#bbffbb"
| February 28 || 1:05 pm || FSSW || Stony Brook* ||  || Baylor Ballpark • Waco, TX || W6–5 || McInvale(1–1) || Lee(0–2) || Montemayor(1) || 1,291 || 4–3 || –
|-

|- bgcolor="#bbffbb"
| March 1 || 6:30 pm || || at * ||  || Don Sanders Stadium • Huntsville, TX || W5–3 || Ott(1–0) || Belton(0–1) || Allen(1) || 1,236 || 5–3 || –
|- bgcolor="#bbffbb"
| March 4 || 6:30 pm || || at * ||  || Cougar Field • Houston, TX || W4–2 || Castano(2–1) || Lantrip(1–2) || Montemayor(2) || 1,109 || 6–3 || –
|- bgcolor="#ffbbbb"
| March 5 || 6:30 pm || || at Houston* ||  || Cougar Field • Houston, TX || L4–10 || King(2–1) || Tolson(1–1) || Hernandez(1) || 1,233 || 6–4 || –
|- bgcolor="#ffbbbb"
| March 6 || 1:00 pm || || at Houston* ||  || Cougar Field • Houston, TX || L2–11 || Romero(1–0) || Lewis(0–2) || Maxwell(1) || 1,255 || 6–5 || –
|- bgcolor="#ffbbbb"
| March 8 || 6:35 pm ||  || * ||  || Baylor Ballpark • Waco, TX || L3–12 || Lewis(1–1) || Ott(1–1) || – || 1,935 || 6–6 || –
|- bgcolor="#ffbbbb"
| March 11 || 6:35 pm || || * ||  || Baylor Ballpark • Waco, TX || L5–9 || Erwin(2–0) || Heineman(1–1) || – || 2,001 || 6–7 || –
|- bgcolor="#ffbbbb"
| March 12 || 5:35 pm || || * ||  || Baylor Ballpark • Waco, TX || L3–5 || Kuchta(1–0) || Ott(1–2) || – || 2,319 || 6–8 || –
|- bgcolor="#bbffbb"
| March 13 || 12:05 pm || || San Diego* ||  || Baylor Ballpark • Waco, TX || W6–3 || Hessemer(1–0) || Judish(0–1) || Montemayor(3) || 1,990 || 7–8 || –
|- bgcolor="#ffbbbb"
| March 13 || 4:05 pm || || New Mexico State* ||  || Baylor Ballpark • Waco, TX || L4–7 || Bradish(1–2) || Hill(0–1) || Erwin(1) || 2,427 || 7–9 || –
|- bgcolor="#ffbbbb"
| March 18 || 4:05 pm || FSSW || Texas Tech ||  || Baylor Ballpark • Waco, TX || L0–5 || Martin(2–0) || Castano(2–2) || – || 2,328 || 7–10 || 0–1
|- bgcolor="#bbffbb"
| March 19 || 3:05 pm || FCS || Texas Tech ||  || Baylor Ballpark • Waco, TX || W4–3 || Ott(2–2) || Moseley(2–2) || Montemayor(4) || 3,523 || 8–10 || 1–1
|- bgcolor="#ffbbbb"
| March 20 || 1:05 pm || FSSW+ || Texas Tech ||  || Baylor Ballpark • Waco, TX || L5–6 || Howard(4–1) || Lewis(0–3) || Dugger(3) || 2,377 || 8–11 || 1–2
|- bgcolor="#ffbbbb"
| March 22 || 6:30 pm || || at Texas–Arlington* ||  || Clay Gould Ballpark • Arlington, TX || L3–6 || Schneider(1–1) || Stone(0–1) || – || 671 || 8–12 || –
|- bgcolor="#bbffbb"
| March 24 || 6:35 pm || || * ||  || Baylor Ballpark • Waco, TX || W8–3 || Heineman(2–1) || Hall(3–2) || – || 2,254 || 9–12 || –
|- bgcolor="#ffbbbb"
| March 25 || 6:30 pm || || at Dallas Baptist* ||  || Horner Ballpark • Dallas, TX || L3–5 || Poche(3–0) || Castano(2–3) || Elledge(6) || 1,412 || 9–13 || –
|- bgcolor="#bbffbb"
| March 26 || 2:00 pm || || at Dallas Baptist* ||  || Horner Ballpark • Dallas, TX || W19–6 || Tolson(2–1) || Stutzman(2–1) || – || 1,389 || 10–13 || –
|- bgcolor="#bbffbb"
| March 29 || 6:05 pm || || * ||  || Baylor Ballpark • Waco, TX || W5–4 || Montemayor(1–0) || Herbelin(1–2) || – || 2,051 || 11–13 || –
|-

|- bgcolor="#ffbbbb"
| April 1 || 6:35 pm || FSSW+ || Kansas ||  || Baylor Ballpark • Waco, TX || L1–6 || Krauth(2–4) || Castano(2–4) || – || 2,080 || 11–14 || 1–3
|- bgcolor="#bbffbb"
| April 2 || 3:05 pm || FSSW+ || Kansas ||  || Baylor Ballpark • Waco, TX || W2–1 || Tolson(3–1) || Weiman(1–2) || Montemayor(5) || 3,066 || 12–14 || 2–3
|- bgcolor="#bbffbb"
| April 3 || 1:05 pm || FSSW+ || Kansas ||  || Baylor Ballpark • Waco, TX || W5–2 || Hill(1–1) || Goddard(2–2) || Montemayor(6) || 2,128 || 13–14 || 3–3
|- bgcolor="#bbffbb"
| April 5 || 6:35 pm || || * ||  || Baylor Ballpark • Waco, TX || W9–5 || Lewis(1–3) || Higginbotham(0–3) || – || 1,973 || 14–14 || –
|- bgcolor="#bbffbb"
| April 6 || 4:05 pm || || Wofford* ||  || Baylor Ballpark • Waco, TX || W4–0 || McInvale(2–1) || Pile(0–1) || – || 1,926 || 15–14 || –
|- bgcolor="#ffbbbb"
| April 8 || 6:00 pm || || at Oklahoma ||  || L. Dale Mitchell Baseball Park • Norman, OK || L3–4 || Neuse(2–1) || Heineman(2–2) || – || 1,370 || 15–15 || 3–4
|- bgcolor="#bbffbb"
| April 9 || 5:00 pm || || at Oklahoma ||  || L. Dale Mitchell Baseball Park • Norman, OK || W6–1 || Tolson(4–1) || Madden(1–2) || Montemayor(7) || 1,633 || 16–15 || 4–4
|- bgcolor="#ffbbbb"
| April 10 || 1:00 pm || || at Oklahoma ||  || L. Dale Mitchell Baseball Park • Norman, OK || L6–711 || Neuse(3–1) || McInvale(2–2) || – || 938 || 16–16 || 4–5
|- align="center" bgcolor=""
| April 13 || 4:05 pm || || Lamar* ||  || Baylor Ballpark • Waco, TX ||  ||  ||  ||  ||  ||  || 
|- align="center" bgcolor=""
| April 15 || 6:35 pm || FSSW+ || Oklahoma State ||  || Baylor Ballpark • Waco, TX ||  ||  ||  ||  ||  ||  || 
|- align="center" bgcolor=""
| April 16 || 3:05 pm || FSSW || Oklahoma State ||  || Baylor Ballpark • Waco, TX ||  ||  ||  ||  ||  ||  || 
|- align="center" bgcolor=""
| April 17 || 1:05 pm || FSSW+ || Oklahoma State ||  || Baylor Ballpark • Waco, TX ||  ||  ||  ||  ||  ||  || 
|- align="center" bgcolor=""
| April 19 || 6:35 pm || || Sam Houston State* ||  || Baylor Ballpark • Waco, TX ||  ||  ||  ||  ||  ||  || 
|- align="center" bgcolor=""
| April 22 || 6:30 pm || || at Kansas State ||  || Tointon Family Stadium • Manhattan, KS ||  ||  ||  ||  ||  ||  || 
|- align="center" bgcolor=""
| April 23 || 2:00 pm || || at Kansas State ||  || Tointon Family Stadium • Manhattan, KS ||  ||  ||  ||  ||  ||  || 
|- align="center" bgcolor=""
| April 24 || 1:00 pm || || at Kansas State ||  || Tointon Family Stadium • Manhattan, KS ||  ||  ||  ||  ||  ||  || 
|- align="center" bgcolor=""
| April 26 || 6:35 pm || || * ||  || Baylor Ballpark • Waco, TX ||  ||  ||  ||  ||  ||  || 
|- align="center" bgcolor=""
| April 29 || 5:30 pm || || at West Virginia ||  || Monongalia County Ballpark • Granville, WV ||  ||  ||  ||  ||  ||  || 
|- align="center" bgcolor=""
| April 30 || 3:00 pm || || at West Virginia ||  || Monongalia County Ballpark • Granville, WV ||  ||  ||  ||  ||  ||  || 
|-

|- align="center" bgcolor=""
| May 1 || 12:00 pm || || at West Virginia ||  || Monongalia County Ballpark • Granville, WV ||  ||  ||  ||  ||  ||  || 
|- align="center" bgcolor=""
| May 10 || 6:35 pm || || * ||  || Baylor Ballpark • Waco, TX ||  ||  ||  ||  ||  ||  || 
|- align="center" bgcolor=""
| May 11 || 4:05 pm || || McNeese State* ||  || Baylor Ballpark • Waco, TX ||  ||  ||  ||  ||  ||  || 
|- align="center" bgcolor=""
| May 13 || 6:35 pm || FSSW+ || TCU ||  || Baylor Ballpark • Waco, TX ||  ||  ||  ||  ||  ||  || 
|- align="center" bgcolor=""
| May 14 || 3:05 pm || FSSW || TCU ||  || Baylor Ballpark • Waco, TX ||  ||  ||  ||  ||  ||  || 
|- align="center" bgcolor=""
| May 15 || 1:05 pm || FSSW+ || TCU ||  || Baylor Ballpark • Waco, TX ||  ||  ||  ||  ||  ||  || 
|- align="center" bgcolor=""
| May 17 || 6:00 pm || || at UTSA* ||  || Nelson W. Wolff Municipal Stadium • San Antonio, TX ||  ||  ||  ||  ||  ||  || 
|- align="center" bgcolor=""
| May 19 || 6:00 pm || LHN || at Texas ||  || UFCU Disch–Falk Field • Austin, TX ||  ||  ||  ||  ||  ||  || 
|- align="center" bgcolor=""
| May 20 || 6:00 pm || LHN || at Texas ||  || UFCU Disch–Falk Field • Austin, TX ||  ||  ||  ||  ||  ||  || 
|- align="center" bgcolor=""
| May 21 || 2:00 pm || LHN || at Texas ||  || UFCU Disch–Falk Field • Austin, TX ||  ||  ||  ||  ||  ||  || 
|-

|- 
! style="background:#003015;color:white;"| Post-Season
|-

|- align="center" bgcolor=""
| May 25 || TBD || || TBD ||  || Chickasaw Bricktown Ballpark • Oklahoma City, OK ||  ||  ||  ||  ||  ||  || 
|- align="center" bgcolor=""
| May 26 || TBD || || TBD ||  || Chickasaw Bricktown Ballpark • Oklahoma City, OK ||  ||  ||  ||  ||  ||  || 
|-

| style="font-size:88%" | Legend:       = Win       = Loss      Bold = Baylor team member
|-
| style="font-size:88%" | All rankings from Collegiate Baseball.

References

Baylor Bears
Baylor Bears baseball seasons